Saint-Éloi is a commune in the Nièvre department, central France.

Population

See also
Communes of the Nièvre department

References

Communes of Nièvre